John Macpherson Berrien (August 23, 1781January 1, 1856) of United States senator from Georgia  and Attorney General of the United States during the presidency of Andrew Jackson.

Early life and education
Berrien was born on August 23, 1781 at Rockingham, Rocky Hill, New Jersey, to Major John Berrien, son of Judge John Berrien, and Margaret Macpherson. He moved with his parents to Savannah, Georgia, in 1782. His mother died three years later.

He graduated from Princeton College in 1796, studied law in Savannah, was admitted to the bar at the age of 18, and began practice in Louisville, Georgia, in 1799. After he returned to Savannah he was elected solicitor of the eastern judicial circuit of Georgia in 1809; judge of the same circuit from 1810 until January 30, 1821, when he resigned. He served as captain of the Georgia Hussars, a Savannah volunteer company, in the War of 1812.

Political career

Berrien was a member of the Georgia Senate from 1822 to 1823. He was elected as a Jacksonian Democrat to the United States Senate and served from March 4, 1825. In The Antelope case of 1824, he argued against the freedom of slaves captured at sea noting slavery "lay at the foundation of the Constitution" and that slaves "constitute the very foundation of your union".

On March 9, 1829, he resigned from the Senate to accept the position of Attorney General in the Cabinet of President Andrew Jackson. His first assignment was to prosecute former Treasury Fourth Auditor Tobias Watkins for embezzlement of public funds. Berrien secured a conviction at a high profile that same year. Later Berrien supported states' rights in the Nullification Crisis. In the case of the Negro Seamen Acts, he considered the acts to be appropriate exercises of the states' police powers, and beyond the reach of the federal government. He resigned from the office of Attorney General on June 22, 1831.

After leaving the Cabinet he resumed the practice of law until he was again elected, as a Whig, to the U.S. Senate and served from March 4, 1841, until May 1845, when he again resigned to accept an appointment to the supreme court of Georgia; again elected in 1845 to the United States Senate to fill the vacancy caused by his second resignation; reelected in 1846 and served from November 13, 1845, until May 28, 1852, when he resigned for the third time.

Berrien's views on sectional issues hardened during his tenure in the Senate and he became aligned with the short-lived Southern Rights Party formed to oppose the Compromise of 1850 and the Wilmot Proviso.

During the 1820s, Berrien was a member of the prestigious society, Columbian Institute for the Promotion of Arts and Sciences, which counted among its members presidents Andrew Jackson and John Quincy Adams and many prominent men of the day, including well-known representatives of the military, government service, medical and other professions.

He served as the chairman of the U.S. Senate Committee on the Judiciary in the 20th, 26th and 27th Congresses. He was president of the American Party convention at Milledgeville in 1855.

Berrien was a slaveholder, and owned 90 according to the 1830 U.S. census. In 1840, he owned eight slaves at his house in Savannah, Georgia, and an additional 140 slaves in surrounding Chatham County. In 1850, he owned 143 slaves.

Death and legacy
Berrien died at his home, now known as the John Berrien House (named for his father), in Savannah on January 1, 1856. He is interred in Laurel Grove Cemetery. Berrien County, Georgia, and Berrien County, Michigan (one of Michigan's Cabinet Counties, organized during his term as attorney general), are named after him.

Berrien was one of the Georgia Historical Society's founders in 1839 and served as the organization's  first president. The Georgia Historical Society holds a substantial collection of Berrien papers (including important material relating to the Petticoat affair). The Society also annually presents the John Macpherson Berrien Award, a lifetime achievement award recognizing outstanding contributions to Georgia history.

References

External links
John Macpherson Berrien Papers in the Digital Library of Georgia
John Macpherson Berrien papers at the Georgia Historical Society

Biography

|-

|-

|-

|-

|-

1781 births
1856 deaths
People from Rocky Hill, New Jersey
United States Attorneys General
Jackson administration cabinet members
Democratic Party United States senators from Georgia (U.S. state)
Jacksonian United States senators from Georgia (U.S. state)
Whig Party United States senators from Georgia (U.S. state)
Georgia (U.S. state) Jacksonians
Georgia (U.S. state) Whigs
Georgia (U.S. state) state senators
Georgia (U.S. state) state court judges
Politicians from Savannah, Georgia
People from Louisville, Georgia
American slave owners
Georgia (U.S. state) lawyers
Erasmus Hall High School alumni
Princeton University alumni
American militiamen in the War of 1812
American militia officers
United States senators who owned slaves